The Kotdwar Municipal Corporation is the civic body that governs the city of Kotdwar in Uttarakhand, India.

Structure 
This corporation consists of 40 wards and is headed by a mayor who presides over a deputy mayor and 39 other corporators representing the wards. The mayor is elected directly through a first-past-the-post voting system and the deputy mayor is elected by the corporators from among their numbers.

List of mayors of the Kotdwar Municipal Corporation

References

Municipal corporations in Uttarakhand
Pauri Garhwal district
Year of establishment missing